The surname Albus means white in Latin.  Albus was a family name of ancient Rome, later lengthened to Albinus. 

The surname may refer to:

 James S. Albus, a Senior National Institute of Standards and Technology Fellow and co-developer of the Marr-Albus theory
 Jim Albus, an American golfer

See also
Albuis (disambiguation)